A Casa is a theatrical comedy in two acts, written by Miguel M. Abrahão in 1978 and published first in 1983 in Brazil.

Plot summary

A Casa, tells a simple story, but its great strength lies in the description passionate and accomplice of the characters.
The theme of the play revolves around a seemingly bitter and cynical idea: a woman should become a prostitute, to sustain itself without effort.
Josinalda, a lady of strict principles, maintains in his house with his meager salary, Liduina, your sister, Fredegund, your niece, and Creuzilene, your neighbor .
Life is peaceful and marked by seemingly commons issues until, unexpectedly, a bandit enters the residence of distinguished ladies, making them hostages.
The play then becomes a police comedy, and thus a fascinating intellectual game of cat and mouse, where not everything looks, like really is.

Bibliography
 Sociedade Brasileira de Autores Teatrais
 National Library of Brazil - Archives

External links
 Literatura Digital - Digital Library of Literature of UFSC
  Encyclopedia of Theatre
 Brazilian Society of playwrights

References

1978 plays
Brazilian plays